Godfrey is an unincorporated community in Bourbon County, Kansas, United States.

History
Godfrey was platted in 1871 as a coal mining community. Godfrey had a post office from 1870 until 1901.

References

Further reading

External links
 Bourbon County maps: Current, Historic - KDOT

Unincorporated communities in Bourbon County, Kansas
Unincorporated communities in Kansas